In mathematics, divided differences is an algorithm, historically used for computing tables of logarithms and trigonometric functions. Charles Babbage's difference engine, an early mechanical calculator, was designed to use this algorithm in its operation.

Divided differences is a recursive division process. Given a sequence of data points , the method calculates the coefficients of the interpolation polynomial of these points in the Newton form.

Definition
Given n + 1 data points

To make the recursive process of computation clearer, the divided differences can be put in tabular form, where the columns correspond to the value of j above, and each entry in the table is computed from the difference of the entries to its immediate lower left and to its immediate upper left, divided by a difference of corresponding x-values:

Notation 
If the data points are given by a function f,

one sometimes writes

for the divided difference instead of writing

or 

Several other notations for the divided difference of the function ƒ on the nodes x0, ..., xn are also used, for instance:

Example

Properties
 Linearity 
 Leibniz rule 
 Divided differences are symmetric: If  is a permutation then 
 If  is a polynomial function of degree , then 
Mean value theorem for divided differences: if  is n times differentiable, then  for a number  in the open interval determined by the smallest and largest of the 's.

Matrix form
The divided difference scheme can be put into an upper triangular matrix:

Then it holds
 
  if  is a scalar
   This follows from the Leibniz rule. It means that multiplication of such matrices is commutative. Summarised, the matrices of divided difference schemes with respect to the same set of nodes x form a commutative ring.
 Since  is a triangular matrix, its eigenvalues are obviously .
 Let  be a Kronecker delta-like function, that is  Obviously , thus  is an eigenfunction of the pointwise function multiplication. Example  The diagonalization of  can be written as

Polynomials and power series
The matrix 

contains the divided difference scheme for the identity function with respect to the nodes , thus  contains the divided differences for the power function with exponent .
Consequently, you can obtain the divided differences for a polynomial function  by applying  to the matrix : If

and

then

This is known as Opitz' formula.

Let  be a function which corresponds to a power series.
If

and

then

Alternative characterizations

Expanded form

With the help of the polynomial function  this can be written as

Peano form

Forward differences

When the data points are equidistantly distributed we get the special case called forward differences. They are easier to calculate than the more general divided differences.

Given n+1 data points

with

the forward differences are defined as

The relationship between divided differences and forward differences is

See also 
 Difference quotient
 Neville's algorithm
 Polynomial interpolation
 Mean value theorem for divided differences
 Nörlund–Rice integral
 Pascal's triangle

References

External links  
 An implementation in Haskell.

Finite differences

de:Polynominterpolation#Bestimmung der Koeffizienten: Schema der dividierten Differenzen